Liene is a Latvian feminine given name. The associated name day is August 18.

Notable people named Liene
Liene Bērziņa (born 1984), Latvian television and radio personality
Liene Fimbauere (born 1989), Latvian alpine skier 
Liene Jansone (born 1981), Latvian basketball player
Liene Liepiņa (born 1957), deputy of the Latvian Saeima
Liene Lutere (born 1976), Latvian rower
Liene Priede (born 1990), Latvian basketball player
Liene Sastapa (born 1972), Latvian rower
Liene Vāciete (born 1991), Latvian football striker

References 

Latvian feminine given names
Feminine given names